Montagut may refer to:

 Montagut (clothing), a French clothing company located in Saint-Sauveur-de-Montagut
 Montagut, Pyrénées-Atlantiques, a French commune
 Montagut i Oix, a Spanish municipality located in Garrotxa, Catalonia, Spain
 Escola Montagut, a Spanish college located in Vilafranca del Penedès, Catalonia, Spain
 Berenguer de Montagut, Catalan architect
 Pere de Montagut, Catalan squire